Lippa is a community in the Ioannina regional unit, Greece. Population 70 (2011). It is 50 km from Ioannina and it belongs to the Selloi municipal unit.

External links
Site about Lippa Village

Populated places in Ioannina (regional unit)